Imelda is a feminine given name. 

Imelda may also refer to:

Places

Philippines 
Imelda, Biliran, a village named after Imelda Marcos
Imelda, Bohol, a village named after Imelda Marcos
Imelda, Zamboanga Sibugay, a municipality named after Imelda Marcos

Other uses
34919 Imelda, an Outer Main-belt Asteroid
Imelda de' Lambertazzi, tragic opera
Imelda (butterfly), a genus of metalmark butterflies in the subfamily Riodininae
 Imelda (film), a 2003 film about Imelda Marcos
"Imelda", song on Mark Knopfler's 1996 album Golden Heart
Tropical Storm Imelda, which caused catastrophic flooding in southeast Texas in September 2019